Corydoras coriatae is a tropical freshwater fish belonging to the Corydoradinae sub-family of the family Callichthyidae. It originates in inland waters in South America. Corydoras coriatae is restricted to Ucayali River basin in Peru.

Etymology
The fish is named in honor of Nery Coriat, a supplier of aquarium fishes from Peru who has worked in the Peruvian fish business for the past 25 years and has contributed a great deal to the business.

References

Reis, R.E., 2003. Callichthyidae (Armored catfishes). p. 291-309. In R.E. Reis, S.O. Kullander and C.J. Ferraris, Jr. (eds.) Checklist of the Freshwater Fishes of South and Central America. Porto Alegre: EDIPUCRS, Brasil.

Corydoras
Catfish of South America
Fish of Peru
Taxa named by Warren E. Burgess
Fish described in 1997